Dave "The King" Wilson is an American radio personality based in Indianapolis. He hosted the afternoon Dave Wilson Show on 93.1 WIBC, (formerly 1070 AM-WIBC), an Emmis Communications station, in Indianapolis until let go in March 2009. Wilson is also a member of the Indianapolis Motor Speedway Radio Network.

Wilson earned the nickname "The King" from his work on The Bob & Tom Show, in which his character was "The King", modeled after Elvis Presley.  He was once the traveling partner with rising comic Jay Leno. Leno called Wilson "The Viking Comic" referring to his large physical size and beard.

Wilson owned One Liner's Comedy club in Greenwood, Indiana, a popular Indianapolis Comedy club and restaurant. The club was also known for an airplane sticking out of its roof. It was closed in 2008.

Indianapolis Motor Speedway Radio Network broadcasting duties 
Indianapolis 500
2003-2008: Booth analyst
2009-2013: Garage area / infield hospital reporter
2014: Pit reporter (north pits)
2015: Statistician
2016: Social media
2017-2019: Garage area / infield hospital reporter

External links
Wilson's webpage

References

American radio personalities
Radio personalities from Indianapolis
IndyCar Series people
Year of birth missing (living people)
Living people